Giovanni Cerretani (died 1492) was a Roman Catholic prelate who served as Bishop of Nocera Umbra (1476–1492).

Biography
On 17 August 1476, Giovanni Cerretani was appointed during the papacy of Pope Sixtus IV as Bishop of Nocera Umbra.
He served as Bishop of Nocera Umbra until his death in July 1492.

References

External links and additional sources
 (for Chronology of Bishops) 
 (for Chronology of Bishops) 

15th-century Italian Roman Catholic bishops
Bishops appointed by Pope Sixtus IV
1492 deaths